Air velocity may refer to:

Wind speed, the speed of the air currents
Airspeed, the speed of an aircraft relative to the air.

See also 

 Airspeed (disambiguation)